Lead Us to Reason is the debut album from Canadian band The Black Maria.

Track listing
 "The Memento" – 3:16
 "Betrayal" – 3:39
 "Organs" – 2:48
 "Our Commitment's a Sickness" – 3:30
 "The Distance from the Bottom" – 3:45
 "The Lines We Cross" – 3:17
 "Mirrors and Cameras" – 3:54
 "Sirens" – 3:05
 "To Have Loved" – 3:49
 "Ash" – 3:19
 "Rats in the Prison" – 2:58

References

The Black Maria albums
2005 debut albums
Victory Records albums